Leonard Stephen Pascoe (born Leonard Stephen Durtanovich, 13 February 1950) is a former Australian Test and One Day International cricketer.

Born at Bridgetown, Western Australia, Pascoe was educated at Punchbowl Boys' High School in New South Wales, where he was a classmate of Jeff Thomson. The two of them would form a close friendship, playing cricket together at club, state and Test level.

Pascoe played in 14 Tests and 29 ODIs between 1977 and 1982, during which time he transferred to World Series Cricket. In the 1980 Centenary Test at The Oval in London, he took 5/59 in the 1st innings. Pascoe retired from international cricket due to a knee injury after the 1981/82 Frank Worrell Trophy series in Australia.

Pascoe is the son of a Macedonian immigrant father. While a former NSW teammate, Geoff Lawson, claimed in his autobiography that Pascoe was often subject to baiting about his ethnicity during matches, especially from brothers Ian and Greg Chappell, this was contradicted by Pascoe in court, under oath in a defamation case, when he stated that such comments were never made.

He is a popular after-dinner speaker. He once stated, tongue-in-cheek, that "a tiger never changes its spots" (in a sarcastic response to wicket-keeper Rod Marsh's comment "I thought you were going to bowl more bouncers").

Pascoe has spoken of an incident when he hit Indian cricketer Sandeep Patil during the 1981–82 series, which he has stated changed him as a cricketer and stated afterwards that he wanted to retire, which he did after playing another three Tests.

In November 2017, after returning home from a tour of South Australia and Western Australia with former teammates Doug Walters and Jeff Thomson, it was reported that Pascoe had been diagnosed with an infection of cryptococcal gattii and had to spend three weeks in a hospital in Sydney for treatment.

In January 2020, Pascoe encouraged singer/songwriter Matt Scullion to write a song about the 1868 Aboriginal cricket tour to England, having been talking to Gamilaraay elder and retired cricketer Les Knox about the event. Scullion wrote the song, titled "1868", and sung it at the second Twenty20 International at the Sydney Cricket Ground in early 2021, and planned to do so again at the Bradman Museum in April 2021.

References

1950 births
Living people
Australia One Day International cricketers
Australia Test cricketers
New South Wales cricketers
World Series Cricket players
Australian people of Macedonian descent
Australian cricketers
People from Bridgetown, Western Australia
Cricketers from Western Australia